ARY Films is a film distribution and production company in Pakistan, part of ARY Digital Network. 35 films including 11 Urdu, six Punjabi and 17 Pashto films have been  released by ARY Films since 2013. Among them, Waar, Jawani Phir Nahi Ani, Wrong No., Jalaibee, 3 Bahadur and Punjab Nahi Jaungi have topped the charts in the industry.

Films 
List of films distributed/produced under the banner ARY Films

Joint ventures 
An MoU was signed between ARY Films and Riaz Shahid Films on 23 November 2013, starting a joint production venture between the two companies announcing two films at the event, Arth 2 and Mission-5.

ARY Films is making a sequel of Waar, to be shot in Pakistan, U.K., Russia, Turkey and Yugoslavia.

On 7 December 2013, ARY Films & MindWorks Media joined hands to produce Pakistani movies. The collaboration started with Waar 2 and Delta Echo Foxtrot, later named Yalghaar.

In early 2014, ARY Films signed an agreement with Summit Entertainment (Pakistan) to release Concordia Productions' feature Tamanna in cinemas across Pakistan on 6 June as part of the new wave of Pakistani films released in 2014. The film premiered on 8 June in London at the 16th London Asian Film Festival.

On 11 September 2014, ARY Films and SOC Films announced a joint venture company named Waadi Animations, in intention to produce animated content including feature films, with the debut project 3 Bahadur.

See also 
 ARY Film Awards
 List of film distributors in Pakistan

References 

Mass media companies of Pakistan
Film distributors of Pakistan
Film production companies of Pakistan
Mass media in Sindh
Companies based in Karachi